Canada Systems Group (CSG) was one of the first data processing service bureaus in Canada.  Featuring IBM and Amdahl mainframes, disk and network processors, alongside StorageTek tape devices, CSG was the largest, followed by Datacrown, whose owner at the time was Crown Life Insurance, and IP Sharp (eventually acquired by Reuters, now Thomson Media). 

Canada Systems Group (EST) Limited was a data processing service bureau based in Mississauga, Ontario, Canada.

Key dates

 October 1970 - CSG created by Eatons, Stelco & London Life with office in TD Tower Floor 37, Toronto
 Spring 1971 - Office moved to Sheridan Mall, Mississauga
 September 1971 Labour Day - Office moved to 2599 Speakman Drive, Mississauga, Ontario.
 Mid November 1971 - Stelco production started at Speakman
 Late January 1972 - Eatons production started at Speakman

History

CSG was originally created by the divestiture of the data processing departments of Eaton's, (Canada's largest department store chain), Stelco (Canada's largest steel producer), and TRW. The latter company dropped out of the triumvirate shortly after CSG was formed, to be replaced by Royal Trust, Canada's largest Trust company.

CSG's head office and main datacentre was located in the Sheridan Park Research Community in Mississauga Ontario. CSG maintained smaller datacentres in Ottawa, Ontario and Calgary, Alberta.  Sales offices were maintained in Vancouver (BC) Calgary (AB), Edmonton (AB), Winnipeg (MA), Toronto (ON), Montreal (PQ), Saint John (NB) and  Washington, DC (USA).

Early in its history, CSG acquired Multiple Financial Services, a financial service bureau, at time the largest in Canada, which provided outsourcing of the  processing and accounting functions for the brokerage and mutual funds industries.

The Mississauga datacentre was one of the largest in North America, consisting of two raised floorspaces of  each. The second floor housed the multiple mainframe processors and hundreds of disk units.  

The first floor housed the network processors, switches, and utilized the first fibre-optic cables available in Canada. In addition, over 200 tape drives, a tape library of over one hundred and thirty thousand serial tape volumes on moveable shelves before disk-packs began to overtake tape data storage and the main console areas (the 'Dais') were on the first floor.

To achieve the required efficiencies, CSG developed its own Pre-Scan software for the IBM MVS Operating System.  This software facilitated tape drives being pre-allocated and tape files pre-mounted by tape operators as a job was read into the job scheduler. Two Job Execution Schedulers  were available from IBM; JES2 which read in the job, created a job address space in memory, and then waited for the requested job resources (tape drive, tape file mounted on drive, ready to read/write) were physically available before starting job execution; and JES3, where the job would be read in by the system, then wait until the requested job resources were physically available and allocated before creating a job address space in memory to begin execution.

CSG's Pre-Scan would read in the job control language statements, parse the necessary resources required to execute the job, then dynamically allocate the physical devices, request the tape mounts,  all while the system created the job address space in memory.  The net result was significantly faster and more efficient throughput by eliminating / minimizing wait times.

CSG then built on this foundation by being one of the first to use StorageTek's Tape Accelerator devices, which buffered tape read and write operations to disc, which in turn improved job throughput even more.

To control such a behemoth, where typically over 160 copies of CICS, IMS and DB2 were executing at any given moment, alongside timeshare and batch processing, required a staff of network and mainframe operators with specialized knowledge, and over two hundred operator consoles.  Console automation was brand new technology at the time (late 1970s) and CSG became an industry leader in this specialty by controlling automatically approximately 95% of the console traffic and operator interventions, using IBM's NetView for network consoles and Candle Corporation's AF/Operator for system consoles.  Gartner Group recognized this achievement, and papers were presented at two annual major IBM Technical conferences, known as SHARE and GUIDE on the automation efforts and achievements. 

CSG was an innovator in many ways, providing the compute power and technical expertise to develop an election results prediction system for Canadian TV networks; a computerized taxi dispatching system with remote terminals installed in the vehicles, first installed in BlueLine Taxis in Ottawa, Ontario, and also the dispatch system for Pizza Pizza, which optimized phone ordering, product production and delivery, which resulted in exponential growth for Pizza Pizza, and enhanced customer satisfaction.

CSG was acquired Singer Business Machines in the 1980s, and renamed STM Systems Corporation.  It was then sold to IBM (minority ownership) and renamed Information Systems Management Corporation.  IBM completed the takeover in the early 1990s, and it is now a division of IBM Canada, that provides outsourcing solutions to many companies in the private and public sector.

Technology companies of Canada
Companies based in Mississauga